Acalypha gracilens is a species of flowering plant in the family Euphorbiaceae. Common names include slender threeseed mercury; three-seeded mercury; shortstalk copperleaf; slender copperleaf. It is native to the south-eastern United States.

Description
Annual. Plant is erect with pubescent stems coming from the taproots. The leaves are alternate with two lateral veins beginning from the base, prominent and parallel to the midrib, crenate to crenate-serrate, or petiolate. The spikes are axillary or terminal, or both. The bracts are leaf-like. There are no petals. The flowers are pistillate with 3–5 sepals and a 3-locular ovary. The staminate flowers with 4 sepals and 8–16 stamens. The capsules are broader than they are long.
 
The plant grows up to 0.8m high. The stems are freely branched and densely pubescent with short incurved (or appressed) ascending trichomes. The leaves are elliptic to elliptic-lanceolate which are 2–6 cm long and 0.5–2 cm wide, obtuse, crenate. The base of the leaves are cuneate to rounded, with pubescence of both surfaces (more or less glabrate). The petioles of principle leaves are 0.4–1.5 cm long. The axillary spike has 1–5 pistillate flowers near the base that are interrupted and continued with a spike of staminate flowers. The pistillate bracts are often stipitate-glandular, teeth triangular, 5–13. The seeds are reddish to black in color and are ovoid, 1.2–1.8mm long. Flowers in June and into late frost.

Distribution
A. gracilens is found throughout the south-eastern U.S. coastal plain and piedmont, eastern midwest, and New England.

Ecology

Habitat 
In the south-eastern U.S. coastal plain it is a common plant found on frequently burned sandhills (Entisols), and in pine flatwoods (Spodosols) and upland pine communities (Ultisols), as well as floodplain forest (Alphasols). It thrives in frequently burned pine communities. It occurs in both native communities and areas with very disturbed soil. It occurs in a fairly wide range of well-drained soils, from deep sand to loams. Its light tolerance is fairly broad, from full light to shaded areas on the margins of clearings. In addition to the coastal plain it is common throughout the Piedmont region and infrequent in the mountains.

Associated species include Liatris gracilis, L. tenuifolia, Polygonella gracilis, Didodia teres, Chrysopis lanuginosa, Rubus cuneifolis, Hypericum gentianoides, Trichostema dichotomum, Eupatorium compositifolium, and others.

Phenology 
Flowers spring to fall through most of its range. Flowers all year in southern Florida.

Seed dispersal
This species is believed to disperse by explosion mechanisms or by ants.

References

External links

gracilens
Flora of the United States